Suncorp Group Limited is an Australian finance, insurance, and banking corporation based in Brisbane, Queensland, Australia.  It is one of Australia's mid-size banks (by combined lending and deposits) and its largest general insurance group, formed on 1 December 1996 by the merger of Suncorp, Metway Bank and the Queensland Industry Development Corporation (QIDC).

History

State Government Insurance Office
Queensland established the State Accident Insurance Office in 1916, to provide mandatory injury compensation insurance to workers in the state's business sector. New legislation soon after created a larger insurance body, the State Government Insurance Office (SGIO) which took over the State Accident Insurance Office. General insurance, third party and life products were added. SGIO later expanded into building society operations, superannuation, and finance.

In 1960, new legislation establishing the SGIO as a separate corporation was passed, and the group became subject to state regulatory oversight. In 1971, the SGIO took another step toward full-fledged corporate status, forming its own board of directors. At this time, the operations involving injury compensation for workers were placed under a separate board. By 1976, as SGIO's insurance operations took on a more commercial orientation, the company closed down its building society operations.

The next step toward the SGIO's move toward the private sector came in 1985. Under new legislation, the company dropped the SGIO name in favour of the name Suncorp and its employees lost their status as civil servants. At the same time, Suncorp became an independent corporation, although still government controlled. By the mid 1990s, Suncorp was an allfinanz (i.e. with combined banking, financial, and insurance operations) group and had assets of nearly $10 billion.

Metway Bank
Metway Bank started as the Metropolitan Permanent Building Society which was founded in 1959. In the late 1980s, Metropolitan joined the trend among Australia's building societies to expand into being full-scale banks. In 1988, Metropolitan abandoned its status as a building society to reincorporate as a bank. Metway, as the new bank was called, listed publicly and began acquiring a number of rival banks and building societies. Metway became the largest Queensland based bank by the mid 1990s. Metway's operations also extended into the other eastern states and the assets of the bank were more than $7 billion.

Queensland Industry Development Corporation
QIDC had its origins in Agbank which was a state government farming financier that was started in 1902. In 1986, new Queensland legislation was passed to incorporate and regulate the bank as the Queensland Industry Development Corporation. By the mid 1990s, QIDC had assets of approximately $3 billion.

Merger as Suncorp-Metway: 1996 to 1999
In response to sweeping changes in Australia's financial and insurance industries in the mid 1990s, and especially the increasing convergence of the banking and insurance sectors, the state owned QIDC and Suncorp were amalgamated with Metway Bank in 1996. The new company, Suncorp-Metway, became one of the largest insurance and finance groups in Australia, ranking fifth in the national market. By 1998, the company's combined assets exceeded $22 billion.

The Queensland government initially controlled 68 percent of the new company, but quickly made good on its promise to sell off most of its stake. In 1997, the company conducted a public offering that reduced the government's stake in Suncorp-Metway to 4 percent, with the last remaining government shares sold one year later. In 1999, Suncorp-Metway completed the integration of the Metway, QIDC and Suncorp operations, and launched a single unified Suncorp-Metway brand. As part of this process, the company also trimmed its retail network, shutting down a number of redundant branches.

Further conglomeration: 2000 to 2006
After its integration phase, Suncorp-Metway began putting into place a new strategy. The company sought to launch itself on a truly national scale, replacing its allfinanz model with a new financial conglomerate strategy. The company wanted to expand, particularly in its more profitable insurance division. The company made its first acquisition in 2001 by taking over GIO General Ltd, which was then part of AMP. That purchase made Suncorp-Metway the second ranked in Australia in terms of income from general insurance in annual premiums.

The company carried out another rebranding exercise in 2002, adopting the Suncorp name for all of its Queensland operations, and for non-insurance operations outside of the state. The company's insurance operations, excluding Queensland, took on the GIO name.

Suncorp continued to build up its insurance portfolio into the middle of the decade. The company acquired 50 percent of the Queensland-based RACQ Insurance, a joint venture originally formed between AMP and RACQ. Suncorp bought out AMP's share of the joint venture in 2002. Also in 2002, Suncorp purchased half of RAA Insurance from the RAA. In 2004, the company purchased Tasmania's RACT Insurance from the RACT.

Promina acquisition: 2007
Suncorp then began preparations for a still larger takeover of insurance giant Promina Group Limited. By early 2007, the two companies had agreed the terms of a merger deal valued at AUD 7.9 billion ($5.9 billion), which represented one of the largest acquisition deals completed in Australia's financial sector since the beginning of the new century.

Promina was formerly part of the UK-based insurance giant Royal and Sun Alliance until it spun off the business in Australia as a separate public company in 2003. The merger transformed Suncorp into a true giant in Australia, doubling its assets to nearly AUD 85 billion ($65 billion).

Recent events
During a retail banking review in 2007, Suncorp determined its credit card portfolio was a non-core asset and entered into talks to sell its 100,000 card/$230 million credit-card portfolio to Citibank. Citibank now handles the operational aspects of credit whilst the Suncorp brand remains on the cards and Suncorp continues to provide customer interaction.

As of 2007, Suncorp had assets of over A$95 billion, over 9 million customers, and over 16,000 staff. Suncorp operated 232 retail and business banking outlets, predominantly in Queensland. GIO operated 34 agencies in NSW and Victoria. An additional 157 retail branches and services centres were added with the Promina acquisition.

In June 2013, Goldman Sachs's Special Situations Group, the proprietary investment unit of the investment bank, purchased some of Suncorp Group Ltd.'s loans for about US$863 million. In the summer of 2013 as European lenders were divesting their loans portfolios, in Australia, hedge funds and investment banks were buying them. In 2013, distressed-debt investors, seeking investment opportunities in Asia, particularly in Australia, acquired discounted bonds or bank loans of companies facing distressed debt, with the potential of profitable returns if the companies' performance or their debt-linked assets improves. In 2013 Australia was one of the biggest markets for distressed-debt investors in Asia.

Suncorp has been granted a MySuper authority, enabling it to continue to receive default superannuation contribution from 1 Jan 2014.

Suncorp Business Services appointed its new CEO, Matt Pancino, on 13 June 2014. Pancino formerly worked as the Chief Information Officer for the group.

Suncorp was inducted into the Queensland Business Leaders Hall of Fame in 2016.

Business interests 
Suncorp covers nearly all areas in wealth and banking, including life insurance, general insurance, commercial insurance, Compulsory Third Party (CTP), banking, finance, superannuation agricultural banking and business banking, the notable exception being health insurance. It is the largest banking and insurance corporation headquartered in Brisbane.

Suncorp is the parent company of insurance company GIO, which is mainly used as a general insurance company representing Suncorp outside Queensland, offering similar products to the Suncorp branded insurance product in Queensland.

Suncorp trades under a number of brands, including AAMI, Apia, Shannons, InsureMyRide, Vero, Terri Scheer, Bingle, CIL and Tyndall insurance brands in Australia, and Vero, Asteron, Guardian Trust, Tyndall, Vero Liability, AA Insurance, SIS, CMV/AXIOM and Autosure brands in New Zealand. These assets were acquired with the Promina Group in 2007. Tal Australia purchased Asteron Australia from Suncorp in December 2018.

Suncorp Bank 

On 19 April 2009, Suncorp announced a re-branding of the banking arm of the company to Suncorp Bank. The reason behind the re-branding is to give the company a view that Suncorp is a bank with an insurance arm, not an insurance company with a banking division. The deal which is subject to regulatory approval is expected to take over 12 months to complete.

Joint ventures 
Suncorp acquired insurance joint ventures with motoring clubs RACQ and RAA in 2001, but chose to divest them in 2010. Suncorp entered into a joint venture agreement with RACT Insurance in Tasmania in 2007, but sold its 50% interest back to RACT in July 2021.

Naming rights 
Suncorp holds the naming rights of Lang Park, currently branded as Suncorp Stadium.  It is a rectangular sporting stadium located in the Brisbane suburb of Milton, and is the home of the Brisbane Broncos and Queensland Reds. Suncorp is also the title sponsor of the Suncorp Super Netball competition in Australia. The naming rights to buildings, including Suncorp Place in Sydney and Suncorp Plaza in Brisbane are also held by the group.

See also 

 Banking in Australia
 List of banks
 List of banks in Australia
 List of banks in Oceania

References

External links 

 
Suncorp Group digital story and oral history: Queensland Business Leaders Hall of Fame 2016, State Library of Queensland

Companies listed on the Australian Securities Exchange
Australian companies established in 1996
Financial services companies established in 1996
Banks established in 1996
Banks of Australia
Insurance companies of Australia
Companies based in Brisbane